Zaghawa may refer to:
 Zaghawa people
 Zaghawa language

Language and nationality disambiguation pages